Rio Fashion Week (RFW) is a fashion week biannually held in Rio de Janeiro, Brazil, organized by FFW.

References 

Fashion events in Brazil
Tourist attractions in Rio de Janeiro (city)
Recurring events established in 1990
Events in Rio de Janeiro (city)
Fashion weeks